The Health Protection (Coronavirus, Restrictions) (All Tiers and Self-Isolation) (England) (Amendment) Regulations 2021 (SI 2021/97) is an emergency statute in response to the COVID-19 pandemic in England, which came into force at 5.00pm on 29 January 2021.

The Regulations increase from £200 to £800 the amount an individual attending a house party involving more than fifteen people can be fined for a first offence. The Regulations also broaden (by amending the Health Protection (Coronavirus, Restrictions) (Self-Isolation) (England) Regulations 2020) the personal details that health service personnel or local authority personnel may disclose about an individual, and extend the permitted uses of those details to include the prevention, investigation, detection or prosecution of offences under those Regulations.

Whilst these Regulations have not themselves expired or been revoked, all of the regulations they amended are no longer in effect.

References

Statutory Instruments of the United Kingdom
2021 in England
COVID-19 pandemic in England
Public health in the United Kingdom
2021 in British law
Law associated with the COVID-19 pandemic in the United Kingdom